Dehnow-e Yasuj (also Romanized as Dehnow-e Yāsūj; also known as Deh-e Now, Dehnow, and Deh Now) is a village in Sarrud-e Shomali Rural District, in the Central District of Boyer-Ahmad County, Kohgiluyeh and Boyer-Ahmad Province, Iran. At the 2006 census, its population was 223, in 48 families.

References 

Populated places in Boyer-Ahmad County